Melbourne is a market town and civil parish in South Derbyshire, England.
It was home to Thomas Cook, and has a street named after him. The population of the civil parish at the 2011 Census was 4,843.

Toponymy
The name Melbourne means "mill stream", i.e. the mill by the stream. It was first recorded in Domesday Book (DB 1086 Mileburne = mill stream) as a royal manor.

Through William Lamb, 2nd Viscount Melbourne, Melbourne is the namesake of the Australian city.

History

A parish church building dates from around 1120.

In 1311, Robert de Holand fortified the existing royal manor house to form Melbourne Castle, though the fortification was never completed. Jean, duc de Bourbon, the most important French prisoner taken at the Battle of Agincourt (1415), was detained at the castle for 19 years.

Plans envisaged imprisoning Mary, Queen of Scots at Melbourne Castle in the 16th century, but it had deteriorated into a poor state of repair.

Melbourne Hall, originally owned by the church, was constructed in stages – mainly in the 17th and 18th centuries. Melbourne Hall gave its name to the Melbourne viscounts and thence indirectly to the cities of Melbourne, Victoria, in Australia and Melbourne, Florida, in the United States.

In 1739, Lady Elizabeth Hastings, daughter of the Earl of Huntingdon, left funds for a charity school in Melbourne in her will.

During the Second World War, a military training railway was operated to the north of the now defunct Melbourne.

Since 2005, Melbourne has run an arts festival every September.

Notable residents
 Robert Bakewell, ironsmith, started his career here in 1706.
 John Joseph Briggs, naturalist, lived in Kings Newton and published a History of Melbourne.
 Thomas Cook, travel agent, was born here in 1808.
 William Dexter, painter, was born here in 1808.
 Viscount Melbourne, British prime minister, 1834 and 1835–1841.
 Rowland Ordish, civil engineer, was born here in 1824.
 Christopher Wilson, composer, was born here in 1874
 John Young, cricketer, was born here in 1876.
Ronald Pope, sculptor and artist
Andrew Cope, English children's author, still lives here today

Places of interest

Melbourne parish church has been described as a "cathedral in miniature" and is one of five churches in Melbourne. The Domesday Book records a church and priest here in 1086. The present church was built about 1120, and most of the original masonry is intact, except for the eastern end which has been refurbished. The roofs, naves, aisles and the aisle windows date from the restoration of the 1630s. A restoration was carried out by Gilbert Scott in 1859–62.

Melbourne Hall was originally the rectory house for the Bishop of Carlisle, but was substantially rebuilt by Thomas and George Coke in the early 18th century. The hall's gardens were laid out with the assistance of royal gardeners in 1704. They contain examples of the work of Derby ironsmith Robert Bakewell. Melbourne Pool was originally used by the nearby mill. The hall is open to the public in August.

The Thomas Cook Memorial Cottages in High Street were built by Thomas Cook who started popular travel in England. Cook was born in Melbourne in 1808 though his birthplace was demolished in 1968. The buildings built in 1890–91 include fourteen cottages, a bakehouse, a laundry and mission hall. They still provide accommodation for some of Melbourne's senior citizens.

Melbourne Market Place is the location of Melbourne's main shops, including the ornate building previously housing the Co-op and a market cross built in 1889, to which a shelter was added in 1953, making it a natural gathering place currently used as Melbourne's primary public transport stop.

Education
Melbourne has two schools: an infant school and a junior school, sharing a single site on Packhorse Road. There are also various pre-schools, such as Kangaroos Pre-School based at the historic Wesley Hall. It is also in the catchment area of Chellaston Academy, with buses provided by Harpur's Coaches and Hawkes Travel.

Sport
The town plays host to Melbourne Rugby Football Club, Melbourne United Football Club, Melbourne Town Cricket Club, Melbourne Royal British Legion Tug of War Club, Melbourne Bowls Club and RAMcc (Ride Around Melbourne Cycling Club). There is also a popular, free entry recreation ground, which holds MTCC, MRFC and MUFC fixtures on a regular basis. There is also a modern sports pavilion, designed by Heath Avery Architects, which will contain changing rooms and toilets, and a desk where people interested in booking out the newly developed astro-turf pitches can book.

As well as Melbourne Bowls Club, there is also Kings Newton Bowls Club based nearby on Packhorse Road.

Culture, industry and transport

The town and the neighbouring village of Kings Newton, were served by a station on the former Melbourne Line between 1868 until 1930. The station became an army-only line until 1945, when it was returned to the London, Midland and Scottish Railway. The line closed to all freight traffic in 1980. By this time, the line was in decline and the tracks remained in situ until 1988. When Derbyshire County Council bought the track from British Rail and converted the section from Chellaston to Worthington via Melbourne into a footpath. The station site has been cleared, however the station masters house remains as a private residence.

The town contains many Georgian buildings and in the 19th century was a centre for framework knitting and footwear manufacture, e.g. Fairystep Shoes. Market gardens have always been a major part of the economy, though now only a handful remain. John Hair's brewery operated in Church Street from 1851 to 1954. East Midlands Airport,  to the east of the town, was opened in the 1960s and has now become a significant regional transport hub. The town's bus service is run by Arriva Midlands. Previously, Trent Barton maintained a small garage in Melbourne, the site going on to become a supermarket. It maintained routes to Swadlincote, Derby, Aston-on-Trent and Weston-on-Trent. Bus services for pupils run to Chellaston Academy every morning and afternoon. In October 2019 Midland Classic Buses introduced a bus link to East Midlands Airport and Ashby de la Zouch and a fast route to Swadlincote via an extension of its route 9 service, now known as airline 9.

There is a wide range of shops and services including a Sainsbury's supermarket, ATMs, a post office, a pharmacy, a library, the Melbourne Assembly Rooms (formerly the Bill Shone Leisure Centre), a youth club and several pubs and restaurants.

In March 2013, Melbourne was ranked as the 15th best town in Britain to live in by The Times newspaper; Melbourne Festival was also named as one of the Top 10 British Craft Events by Country Living. In April 2013, Melbourne became the first town in Derbyshire to receive Walkers are Welcome Town status.

See also
Listed buildings in Melbourne, Derbyshire

References

External links

 About Melbourne
 Melbourne news from the Derby Telegraph
 derbyphotos.co.uk: Photo Gallery of Melbourne

 
Market towns in Derbyshire
Towns in Derbyshire
South Derbyshire District
Civil parishes in Derbyshire